Kenisha LaCarol Pratt (February 13, 1980 – December 19, 2019) was an American songwriter and vocal producer, known for her songwriting credits on songs by artists such as Brandy, Toni Braxton, TLC, Yahzarah, Burhan G and Hadise, and her brother K-Young.

Career 
Pratt, the daughter of an accomplished voice and piano teacher, was the older sister of Kenneth "K-Young" Pratt, songwriter and lead singer of R&B group 3rd Storee, and Keana Pratt. The siblings were raised in Inglewood, California. The recipient of a full music scholarship from guitarist Tommy Tedesco, Pratt received her degree from the Musicians Institute in Los Angeles, California. In the late 1990s, she ventured into professional songwriting under the tutelage of music producer Rodney "Darkchild" Jerkins with whom she worked on Michael Jackson's album Invincible (2001) and TLC's 3D (2002).

The following year, she co-wrote several songs on Jerkins' regular collaborator Brandy's third studio album Full Moon, including lead single "What About Us?" for which Pratt was awarded a BMI Citation of Achievement Award the following year. Pratt would become a frequent collaborator on Brandy's subsequent projects Afrodisiac (2004) and Human (2008) apart from working with her on tracks which they co-wrote for other artists such as Toni Braxton. In addition, Pratt co-wrote the majority of her brother's solo debut album Learn How to Love, released in 2005, and was consulted by producers such as Mike City, Soulshock & Karlin, Bink!, Cool & Dre, Bryan Michael Cox, and Timbaland.

Death
In January 2020, K-Young took to Instagram to announce that his sister had died on December 19, 2019, at the age of 39.

Songwriting credits
 Brandy – "Anybody", "Apart", "What About Us?", "Nothing", "When You Touch Me", "Wow" (Full Moon; 2002)
 TLC – "Over Me" (3D; 2002)
 Toni Braxton – "Always", "Selfish" (More Than a Woman; 2002)
 Yahzarah – "One Day" (Blackstar; 2003)
 Toni Braxton  – "Whatchu Need" (Ultimate Toni Braxton; 2003)
 Brandy – "Afrodisiac", Sadiddy" (Afrodisiac; 2004)
 Hadise – "Bad Boy" (Sweat; 2005)
 K-Young – Learn How to Love  (2005)
 Mimi Terrell – "Give It to Me" (It's Mimi; 2005)
 Booty Luv – "A Little Bit" (Boogie 2nite; 2007)
 Burhan G – "Can't Let U Go", "This Is Our World" (Breakout; 2007)
 Li Yuchun – "My Kingdom" (Mine; 2007) 
 Sibel – "I'm Sorry" (The Diving Belle; 2008)

References

African-American songwriters
African-American women writers
1980 births
2019 deaths
African-American women musicians
20th-century African-American people
21st-century African-American people
20th-century African-American women
21st-century African-American women